Heather D. E. Jones (born October 8, 1970) is a former field hockey player from Canada, who represented her native country at the 1992 Summer Olympics in Barcelona, Spain. There she ended up in seventh place with the Canadian National Women's Team.

Born in Edmonton, Alberta, Jones attended Rutgers University, where she played for the Scarlet Knights.

References

External links
 
 
 

1970 births
Living people
Canadian female field hockey players
Olympic field hockey players of Canada
Field hockey players at the 1992 Summer Olympics
Pan American Games medalists in field hockey
Pan American Games silver medalists for Canada
Field hockey players at the 1991 Pan American Games
Sportspeople from Edmonton
Rutgers Scarlet Knights field hockey players
Medalists at the 1991 Pan American Games
20th-century Canadian women
21st-century Canadian women